The men's synchronised 10 metre platform diving competition at the 2012 Olympic Games in London took place on 30 July at the Aquatics Centre within the Olympic Park.

The Chinese team of Cao Yuan and Zhang Yanquan won the gold medal.

Format
A single round was held, with each team making six dives.  Eleven judges scored each dive:  three for each diver, and five for synchronisation.  Only the middle score counted for each diver, with the middle three counting for synchronisation.  These five scores were averaged, multiplied by 3, and multiplied by the dive's degree of difficulty to give a total dive score.  The scores for each of the five dives were summed to give a final score.

Schedule 
Times are British Summer Time (UTC+1)

Results

References

Diving at the 2012 Summer Olympics
2012
Men's events at the 2012 Summer Olympics